Joachim Yaw Acheampong (born 2 November 1973 in Accra), known as Yaw, is a Ghanaian retired footballer who played as a midfielder.

Club career
In his country Yaw represented Goldfields Obuasi (1990–94), Power FC (1999–2000) and King Faisal Babes (2001). Abroad he played for IFK Norrköping in Sweden (1994–95), Spain's Real Sociedad (1995–97) and Hércules CF (1997–98) and Samsunspor (1998) and Yimpaş Yozgatspor (2001–02) from Turkey.

Yaw retired from professional football at the age of only 28.

International career
Yaw was part of the Ghanaian Olympic team who won the bronze medal at the 1992 Summer Olympics in Barcelona. He featured in five of six games in the tournament.

Yaw gained 18 caps with the full side, during five years. He appeared in two Africa Cup of Nations editions.

References

External links
 
 
 
 
 

1973 births
Living people
Footballers from Accra
Ghanaian footballers
Association football midfielders
Ashanti Gold SC players
Power F.C. players
King Faisal Babes FC players
Allsvenskan players
IFK Norrköping players
La Liga players
Segunda División players
Real Sociedad footballers
Hércules CF players
Süper Lig players
Samsunspor footballers
Yimpaş Yozgatspor footballers
Ghana international footballers
1996 African Cup of Nations players
Footballers at the 1992 Summer Olympics
Olympic footballers of Ghana
Olympic medalists in football
Olympic bronze medalists for Ghana
Medalists at the 1992 Summer Olympics
Ghanaian expatriate footballers
Expatriate footballers in Sweden
Expatriate footballers in Spain
Expatriate footballers in Turkey
Ghanaian expatriate sportspeople in Sweden
Ghanaian expatriate sportspeople in Spain
Ghanaian expatriate sportspeople in Turkey
Ghana Premier League managers
Elmina Sharks F.C. managers